Sniper: Legacy is a 2014 American direct-to-video action film directed by Don Michael Paul. It is the fifth installment in the Sniper film series and a sequel to Sniper: Reloaded (2011).

Plot
After military leaders are assassinated, Brandon Beckett (Chad Michael Collins), receives word that his father, Thomas Beckett (Tom Berenger), was among the people assassinated. Attempting to track down David Simpson (Doug Allen), the assassin, a renegade 75th Ranger Regiment sniper, Brandon finds out that his father isn't dead and realizes that he is being used as bait.

Cast
 Tom Berenger as Master Gunnery Sergeant Tom Beckett
 Chad Michael Collins as Gunnery Sergeant Brandon Becket
 Dominic Mafham as Major Guy "Bullet Face" Bidwell
 Mercedes Mason as Corporal Sanaa Malik
 Doug Allen as David Simpson
 Dennis Haysbert as Colonel
 Alex Roe as Reese
 Nestor Serrano as Steffen
 Yana Marinova as Crane
 Mark Lewis Jones as Shope
 Patrick Garrity as Reese's Spotter
 Woon Young Park as Cantara
 Raicho Vasilev as Afghanistan Leader (uncredited)

References

External links

2014 films
2014 action films
Films about snipers
Films about the United States Marine Corps
Direct-to-video sequel films
Films directed by Don Michael Paul
Films scored by Frederik Wiedmann
Films with screenplays by John Fasano
American action films
Destination Films films
Sony Pictures direct-to-video films
Sniper (film series)
2010s English-language films
2010s American films